Kiel Reijnen (born June 1, 1986) is an American cyclist, who currently competes for American gravel team Trek Driftless.

Career 
Reijnen was born in Bainbridge Island, Washington.

In 2010 he finished third in the United States National Road Race Championships, and had several strong results while riding in events in the 2009–10 UCI Asia Tour – he won the Tour of Thailand, finished third in the Tour of Qinghai Lake, and came in the top 10 of both the Tour of Hainan and the Tour de Korea. In 2012, he finished third in the United States National Road Race Championships for the second time in three years, and finished ninth overall at the Tour of Qinghai Lake.

UnitedHealthcare (2013–15)
He won the Philadelphia International Cycling Classic and finished third again at the United States National Road Race Championships. In 2014 he finished second to Jure Kocjan in the points classification at the Tour of Utah, won the Philadelphia International Cycling Classic for the second successive year as well as a stage and the sprints classification in the USA Pro Cycling Challenge. In 2015 he once again won a stage and the sprints competition in the USA Pro Cycling Challenge, and won the King of the Mountains competition in the Tour de Langkawi. For the fourth time in six years, he finished third at the United States National Road Race Championships, and won the opening stage of the Tour of Utah.

Trek–Segafredo (2016–21)
He won the fifth stage of the Tour of Utah and took the overall points classification. Reijnen also entered the first Grand Tour of his career when he was named in the startlist for the Vuelta a España. During the race he earned two top 10 stage finishes while riding as a domestique, in support of Spain's Haimar Zubeldia, as well as Fabio Felline, who ultimately won the points classification. In 2017, Reijnen took another top-ten finish at the United States National Road Race Championships, and he made his individual début at the UCI Road World Championships, competing in the road race. He contested the Vuelta a España in 2018, and 2019, completing both. In the latter, he was initially riding in support of Gianluca Brambilla as well as sprinter John Degenkolb, but Degenkolb was unable to claim any stage victories and the highest placed rider on the general classification ended up being fellow American Peter Stetina. In his final two seasons, Reijnen did not record any top-ten finishes and he failed to finish the 2021 Vuelta a España.

Gravel racing
In June 2021, he competed in Unbound Gravel, being a favorite to win along with other American professionals including Ian Boswell and Quinn Simmons. Unfortunately for Reijnen he suffered a mechanical early in the race while riding in the front group. He was no longer concerned with winning the race, but he wanted to finish the race to honor the hundreds of other participating riders. As such he picked up his bike and began running, hoping to reach the first neutral zone about thirty miles away where he could have repairs made. After making some running repairs to get his bike rolling again, so he no longer had to carry it, he continued walking, but after eighteen miles he realized he did not have enough water for the remaining journey and withdrew from the race.

Following his retirement from road racing, Reijnen formed part of a three-rider Trek Driftless setup for the 2022 season along with Amity Rockwell and Ruth Winder, who had also retired from road racing following the 2021 season.

Personal life
Reijnen attended the University of Colorado Boulder and obtained a degree in mechanical engineering. A member of the Cowlitz Indian Tribe, Reijnen is married with two daughters.

Major results

2008
 5th Overall Tour of Hainan
2010
 1st  Overall Tour of Thailand
1st Stage 1 (ITT)
 3rd Road race, National Road Championships
 3rd Overall Tour of Qinghai Lake
 4th Overall Tour of Hainan
 6th Overall Tour de Korea
2011
 1st  Overall Tour du Rwanda
1st Prologue, Stages 1, 2 & 4
2012
 3rd Road race, National Road Championships
 9th Overall Tour of Qinghai Lake
2013
 1st Philadelphia International Cycling Classic
 1st Bucks County Classic
 1st Stage 4 Tour of the Gila
 3rd Road race, National Road Championships
2014
 1st Philadelphia International Cycling Classic
 Armed Forces Association Cycling Classic
1st Clarendon Cup
1st Crystal Cup
 USA Pro Cycling Challenge
1st  Sprints classification
1st Stage 1
2015
 USA Pro Cycling Challenge
1st  Sprints classification
1st Stage 3
 1st Stage 1 Tour of Utah
 1st  Mountains classification Tour de Langkawi
 3rd Road race, National Road Championships
2016
 Tour of Utah
1st  Sprints classification
1st Stage 5

Grand Tour general classification results timeline

References

External links

1986 births
Living people
American male cyclists
American people of Dutch descent
People from Bainbridge Island, Washington
Cyclists from Washington (state)
University of Colorado Boulder alumni